Yeshiva Gedolah of Cliffwood is an Orthodox Jewish yeshiva in Cliffwood, New Jersey. Founded in 2004, it offers high school, beis medrash, and kollel programs. Located in Cliffwood (part of Aberdeen Township), it has a Keyport mailing address.

History
The yeshiva was founded in 2004 by Rabbi Shimon Alster, who was previously a maggid shiur in the Mesivta of Long Beach in Long Beach, New York, for over 30 years. Alster is also the rabbi of Bais Medrash Torah U’tefilla in Flatbush.

Controversy
In August 2016 the citizens of Cliffwood Beach voiced their concerns against an expansion of the Yeshiva Gedolah of Cliffwood due to zoning restrictions on the area that is being planned for its construction.

References

External links
“Herzka Family Hachnosas Sefer Torah at Yeshiva of Cliffwood” matzav.com, 16 May 2010

2004 establishments in New Jersey
Orthodox yeshivas in New Jersey
Educational institutions established in 2004
Aberdeen Township, New Jersey